Sipi or SIPI may refer to:

 Sipí, a municipality and town in the Chocó Department, Colombia
 Sipi (film), a Ugandan film
 Southwestern Indian Polytechnic Institute, a community college in Albuquerque, New Mexico
 Sipi, mutton flaps, an inexpensive cut of meat from a sheep

See also 
 Sippi